Niki Moser and Cedrik-Marcel Stebe were the defending champions, but they did not compete in the Juniors this year.

Márton Fucsovics and Hsieh Cheng-peng won in the finals 7–6(7–5), 5–7, [10–1] against Julien Obry and Adrien Puget.

Seeds

Draw

Finals

Top half

Bottom half

External links 
 Main Draw

Boys' Doubles
US Open, 2009 Boys' Doubles